The Kashgar–Hotan railway or Kahe railway (abbreviated ), is a single-track, non-electrified, railway in Xinjiang, China between Kashgar and Hotan. The line extends the Southern Xinjiang Railway south from Kashgar. Construction began in December 2008. The line opened to freight traffic on December 30, 2010. Passenger service began on June 28, 2011. Beyond Hotan, it continues as the Hotan–Ruoqiang railway.

If built, the proposed Khunjerab Railway, a part of the China–Pakistan Economic Corridor, would link Islamabad in Pakistan to Hotan and the Chinese railway network.

Station list

See also

 List of railways in China

References

Railway lines in China
Rail transport in Xinjiang
Kashgar
Hotan
Railway lines opened in 2010